Suicide in Nepal has become a minor national issue highlighted by a series of high-profile suicides in recent years. Ranked 126th by suicide rate globally by the 2015 World Health Organization report, Nepal has an estimated 6,840 suicides annually, or 8.2 suicides per 100,000 people. Suicide is currently the leading cause of death for Nepalese women aged 15–49.

Underreporting
The rate of suicide in Nepal has been reported to be as low as 3.7/100,000 as a result of under reporting caused by issues of legality, social stigma, and logistical problems.

Suicide is illegal in Nepal and is punishable by fines and imprisonment. According to the director of Samanta, a Nepalese organization for women’s rights, "most families will never report suicide cases as they are afraid of being entangled in police cases." In attempts to avoid legal trouble, suicidal patients and their families may avoid going to hospitals for treatment. Even after death, victims of suicide may have their deaths misattributed to avoid legal problems for their families.

Families may also avoid reporting suicides due to social stigma and discrimination against people with mental health problems. Despite the recent abundance of articles discussing suicide in Nepal, issues related to suicide are largely avoided, both as the result and perpetuation of a powerful social stigma against mental illness. For women in particular, the under reporting of suicides and suicide-attempts may be caused in part by a "culture of silence", especially in cases related to domestic abuse.

Finally, logistical issues pose a threat to accurate reporting and record keeping. According to the Nepal Health Sector Support Programme, due to "poor record keeping by police and hospitals" as well as the fact that "registration systems are inaccurate and of poor quality," suicide may continue to be under reported even if social and legal issues were to be resolved.

Gender
In 2009, the Nepalese Family Health Division's Maternal Mortality and Morbidity Study published the "shocking finding" that suicide was the leading cause of death for women of reproductive age (15-49). According to the report, "analysis of verbal autopsy data indicates mental health problems, relationships, marriage and family issues are key factors" with 21% of suicides among women of reproductive age consisting of women 18 or younger, "indicating that youth is a factor to be investigated." Although the suicide rate for men remains higher almost universally as well as in Nepal (30.1/100,000 for men, 20.0/100,000 for women), Nepal has a relatively high ratio of female:male suicides and stands out as being ranked 17th for male suicide rates but 3rd for female suicide rates. It's worth noting that while male suicide rates are higher, it is estimated that Nepalese women attempt suicide three times more than men do. Additionally, the tie ins to maternal health, domestic violence, and youth have made female suicide a prominent issue. A case study published in the same mortality report exemplifies the type of problems that women may face:

Sanju was a 21 years old, illiterate and mother of two children. By her third pregnancy she was anaemic and malnourished, feeling dizzy and weak, but she received no antenatal care. In her third month of pregnancy she was about to travel to her maternal home with her husband, but her relatives stopped her as there was a flood. She went to her room to rest, but when her mother-in-law went to her room an hour later she said she had eaten some medicine for killing lice. Her husband, mother-in-law and neighbour took her to the local medicine shop in their cart, and the pharmacist immediately referred her to the district hospital. The family borrowed money and took her to hospital in a private van, a 25 minute journey. She was admitted to the emergency ward and attended to by the doctor immediately, but died within a few hours. The above account was given by her mother-in-law. However, the female community health volunteer said Sanju suffered from hysteria and was being forced to have an illicit relationship with her father-in-law. She was treated for her hysteria but forced to continue the relationship, and therefore was tense. The FCHV and VHW felt this may have been the reason she committed suicide.

More indirectly, gender based inequality in Nepal has been suggested as the cause of female suicide in Nepal. The prominence of suicide among women of reproductive age may be as a result of unwanted pregnancies and early marriages. For Nepalese women, being married can come with the cost of leaving one's family and friends, creating a "perennial cycle of dependence, which may lead some to view suicide as their only option.

Notable cases
 Vishvajit Malla,  Malla Dynasty King of Kantipur
 Yogmaya Neupane, Women's Right Activist
 Sungdare Sherpa, Mountaineer
 Bhimsen Thapa, Prime Minister of Nepal
 Bharat Raj Upreti, Supreme Court Justice
Alok Nembang, Nepali Movie director
Anil Adhikari (Yama Buddha), Nepali Rapper
Rahul Rai, Nepali Singer

References

Health in Nepal
Women in Nepal
Death in Nepal
Nepal
Suicide in Nepal